The Phascolarctidae (φάσκωλος (phaskolos) -  pouch or bag, ἄρκτος (arktos) - bear, from the Greek phascolos + arctos meaning pouched bear) is a family of marsupials of the order Diprotodontia, consisting of only one extant species, the koala, and six well-known fossil species, with another five less well known fossil species, and two fossil species of the genus Koobor, whose taxonomy is debatable but are placed in this group. The closest relatives of the Phascolarctidae are the wombats, which comprise the family Vombatidae.

The fossil record of the family dates back to the Middle Miocene or Late Oligocene.

Classification
Family Phascolarctidae
 Genus Nimiokoala
Riversleigh rainforest koala - Nimiokoala greystanesi
 Genus Invictokoala
Invictokoala monticola
 Genus Madakoala
Madakoala robustus
Madakoala wellsi
Madakoala devisi
 Genus Litokoala
Litokoala garyjohnstoni
Litokoala kutjamarpensis
Litokoala kanunkaensis
 Genus Koobor
Koobor jimbarrati
Koobor notabilis
 Genus Perikoala
Perikoala palankarinnica
Perikoala robustus
 Genus Phascolarctos
Phascolarctos maris
Koala - Phascolarctos cinereus
Giant koala - Phascolarctos stirtoni
Phascolarctos yorkensis (formerly Cundokoala yorkensis)
 Genus Priscakoala
Priscakoala lucyturnbullae

References

External links

 Koalas with evolutionary information.

Vombatiforms
Koalas
Extant Chattian first appearances
Mammal families